Talaqie TV (Arabic قناة تلاقي, literal translation "Meeting") was a television station based in Damascus, Syria since 6 October 2012. The Ministry of Information and RTV launched on 20 May 2013 officially the satellite TV channel Talaqie which provides coverage of national, politics, social and economic issues. TV Channel was shut down in 2016.

References

External links
Talaqie TV official website 
Talaqie TV live stream 
 

2012 establishments in Syria
Arabic-language television stations
Television channels in Syria
Television channels and stations established in 2012
Mass media in Damascus